Glenda Kelly (born June 3, 1944) is a former American Democrat politician who served in the Missouri House of Representatives and as mayor of St. Joseph, Missouri from 1991 until 1994.

Born in San Diego, California, she graduated from the Missouri Western State College.  She previously worked as a legal secretary.

References

1944 births
Living people
20th-century American politicians
21st-century American politicians
20th-century American women politicians
21st-century American women politicians
Democratic Party members of the Missouri House of Representatives
Mayors of places in Missouri
Women mayors of places in Missouri
Politicians from St. Joseph, Missouri
Women state legislators in Missouri